James Wangsness is an American politician and farmer serving as a member of the South Dakota House of Representatives from the 23rd district. A former commissioner of Hand County, South Dakota, Wangsness was appointed to the House by Governor Kristi Noem in 2019 after the resignation of Justin Cronin.

References 

Living people
Republican Party members of the South Dakota House of Representatives
People from Hand County, South Dakota
American farmers
Farmers from South Dakota
Year of birth missing (living people)
21st-century American politicians